JHC may refer to:

 JHC, a Christogram
 Jaffna Hindu College, a boys' public national school in Jaffna, Sri Lanka
 Jesus H. Christ, an example of slang serving as a profanity
 Jesus Henry Christ, a 2012 comedy based on Dennis Lee's Student Academy Award-winning short film of the same name
 John Hancock Center, a 100-story, 1,127-foot tall skyscraper in Chicago, Illinois
 Joint Helicopter Command, a tri-service organisation uniting military helicopters of the British Armed Forces
 Journal of Higher Criticism, an academic journal
 Journal of Histochemistry and Cytochemistry, a peer-reviewed scientific journal of cell biology
 Jurong Health Connect, a community health project started in Jurong
 J.M. High Company
 J. H. Carlisle
 JAPW Heavyweight Championship
 JHC Avto
 JHC Bars
 JHC Reaktor
 JW Hunt Cup
 Jai Hind College
 JCW Heavyweight Championship
 JHC Spartak
 Järfälla HC, a hockey club in Järfälla, Sweden

People 
 James Henry Callander (1803–1851)
 J. Hinckley Clark (1830s–1880s)
 J. Harwood Cochrane (1912–2016)
 James Hodge Codding (1849–1919)
 James H. Cone (1936–2018)
 James H. Connors (died 1941)
 J. H. Conradie (1897–1966)
 James H. Conyers (1855–1935)
 James H. Coon (1914–1996)
 J. Harry Covington (1870–1942)
 James Henry Coyne (1849–1942)
 James Hoey Craigie (1870–1930)
 James H. Cromartie (born 1944)
 John Horton Conway (1937–2020), English mathematician
 J. H. Cobbina, Ghanaian police officer
 Josh Harvey-Clemons (born 1994), American football player

See also